Bramble Peak is a peak,  high, that surmounts the northeast side of the head of Croll Glacier, in the Victory Mountains, Victoria Land. It was mapped by the United States Geological Survey from surveys and from U.S. Navy air photos, 1960–64, and named by the Advisory Committee on Antarctic Names for Edward J. Bramble, aircraft operator of the U.S. Navy aviation flight squadron VX-6 at the McMurdo Station in 1967.

References

Mountains of Victoria Land
Borchgrevink Coast
Two-thousanders of Antarctica